The Patriotic Komitas Union of Montenegro is an ethnic nationalist, right-wing populist and anti-Serbian political party in Montenegro which was founded in late 2020, shortly after the 2020 Montenegrin parliamentary election. The party has no seats in the national parliament, and is yet to contest the parliamentary election.

History

Party forming and ideology
The Patriotic Komitas Union was founded in October 2020, shortly after the 2020 Montenegrin parliamentary elections, in which the opposition parties won majority in the parliament, for the first time since 1990 and the introduction of parliamentary system in the country.

After the fall of the DPS populist regime from the position of power after 30 years, in the aftermath of the 2020 parliamentary election, union of "Montenegrin patriotic organizations" organized mass rallies, so-called "Patriotic gatherings", in Cetinje and in the capital Podgorica, in support of the outgoing DPS regime, due to the alleged "threat for Montenegrin statehood and independence", in case of democratic regime change in the country.

At the first "Patriotic gathering" in Cetinje, Montenegrin nationalists performed anti-Serb songs by Miroslav Škoro and Marko Perković Thompson.

During the following rally which was held at the Podgorica Capital City main Square, the participants and organizers of the rally accused the new parliamentary majority of allegedly working against Montenegrin national interests, calling them a "threat to country independence and statehood." The rally was also marked by inappropriate messages to leaders and members of some parties of the new majority, who were labeled as "traitors" and "chetnik scoundrels". Rally participants's nationalist rhetoric and hate speech has been condemned by numerous media outlets, Montenegrin public figures, artists, university professors, academic and student associations, human rights activists and NGOs.

After the DPS officially admitted electoral defeat and went into opposition in mid-September 2020, a few minor Cetinje-based "Montenegrin patriotic organizations" started an initiative of forming a more socially conservative, ethnic nationalist and pro-unrecognized Montenegrin Orthodox Church party, a former member of the Cetinje-based right-wing and nationalist "Montenegrin Movement" Tatjana Knežević-Perišić, was elected first president of the new party. The organization perceives that the new ruling coalition wants to assimilate ethnic Montenegrins and make them Serbs, also presenting these allegations, as part of an alleged "centuries-old Serbian conspiracy against the Montenegrin people." According to them, their primary goal is to defend Montenegrin identity and overall Montenegrin heritage, rooted through many –year long existence, with all democratic means available. The new party membership is "disappointed with the opinion of EU and the international community on media, political and Serbian nationalist "offensive", Montenegro has been exposed to recently."

The part of the name "Komitas" (also refers as the "Komitadji") refers to the historical Italian-backed "Montenegrin Greens" guerrilla organization which led the uprising against the unification of Montenegro with the Kingdom of Serbia and later Kingdom of Yugoslavia in 1919 and early 1920s. During World War II, Greens were activated once again, organized as a pro-Axis collaborationist unit, in an attempt to re-establish Montenegro as a Fascist Italy client state, the organization was banned in 1945, as well with its political wing Montenegrin Federalist Party, which policy was also defined by close and collaborationist ratio with Italians and the Axis forces in the WWII, but also in the 1930s during the Interwar period.

Activities and further agenda
Since its foundation, Patriotic Komitas Union of Montenegro employed a right-wing populist, Montenegrin nationalist, as well an ethnic ultranationalist discourse, their public appearance and ideology are often characterized with frequent usually unfounded anti-Serb sentiment statements, reinforcing its arguments about the alleged “vulnerability of the nation” party often using controversial fringe theories and historical revision in its public address to supporters. In October 2020, party members provided public support for setting up military training grounds and holding military exercises in a protected nature park on Mount Sinjajevina, against which Montenegrin and European environmental activists have been protesting for months. They accuse eco activists of allegedly working "against country interests", calling them "enemies of Montenegro", quote; "Whoever is bothered by the army does not love the country, i am ready for fight, to defend our country." PKS is also known for steady supporting the rights of the canonical unrecognized Montenegrin Orthodox Church, as well advocating for the rehabilitation of some pro-Axis collaborationist organizations and controversial political figures from World War II, such as Montenegrin Greens, Montenegrin Federalist Party, Sekula Drljević and Savić Marković Štedimlija. After the fall of Milo Đukanović regime from the position of power after 30 years, in the aftermath of the 2020 parliamentary election, the party claimed that the new big tent ruling coalition "wants to assimilate ethnic Montenegrins and make them Serbs". Also expressing concern due to the alleged "threat for Montenegrin statehood and independence", in case Đukanović's party falls from a position of power. PKS, together with parts of outgoing government parties, such as DPS and LPCG, although they are declaratively pro-western, started pushing the narrative of "Montenegro being left to Serbia" by the United States and the EU, publicly accusing American and European diplomats in Montenegro, which some media presented as a new turn in the foreign policy of the outgoing DPS regime, as well its affiliated parties. Party members often call for a fight against what they call "Serbian aggression against Montenegro", "Serbian occupiers" and "domestic traitors who want the disappearance of Montenegro", stating that they are ready to fight for their goals and "outside democratic manners practiced by the DPS", "following the example of their ancestors".

In early 2021, members of the new Montenegrin cabinet were attacked by Montenegrin nationalist activists in several Montenegrin settlements. The PKS and its members claimed responsibility for most of the attacks, addressing its supporters on its official pages. In January 2021, now opposition Milo Đukanović's DPS announced its future activities within the so-called "Montenegrin statehood bloc", together with its long-standing minor coalition partners, as well with some newly formed nationalist parties and initiatives, including the PKS, with which they formalized cooperation in February 2021, invoking Đukanović's party role in restoring Montenegrin statehood in 2006, as well accusing the new technocratic cabinet of Montenegro of allegedly "threatening Montenegro's national interests, sovereignty and independence". During the 2021 Nikšić local election campaign, PKS members organized attacks on local activists and members of Peace is Our Nation, Civic Movement URA and For the Future lists, in several populated places throughout the municipality. On 27 February 2021, the Montenegrin media published a photo of some party candidates at the local elections, in which they practice the fascist salute, carrying Montenegrin Greens (an Interwar and WWII pro-Axis paramilitary) flag, which caused controversy in the Montenegrin society. Patriotic-Komitas Union adopted the Montenegrin Greens flag and slogan as its official symbols.

On 31 March 2021, the party sent a letter to the embassies of a number of countries such as the United States, United Kingdom, Germany and also the European Union. In this letter the party alleged that Montenegrins were at risk of extinction due to high immigration from Serbia and Russia.

See also
Montenegrin nationalism
Montenegrin Greens
Montenegrin Federalist Party

References

2020 establishments in Montenegro
Christian political parties in Montenegro
Conservative parties in Montenegro
Montenegrin nationalism
National conservative parties
Nationalist parties in Europe
Political parties established in 2020
Right-wing parties in Europe
Right-wing populism in Montenegro
Right-wing populist parties
Far-right politics